Barbara Grabowska (28 November 1954 – 12 August 1994) was a Polish actress. She starred in the 1981 film Fever. The film was entered into the 31st Berlin International Film Festival, where Grabowska won the Silver Bear for Best Actress.

She died aged 39. Her body was found near the railroad tracks near Częstochowa.

Selected filmography
 Fever (1981)
 The Last Ferry (1989)

References

External links
 

1954 births
1994 deaths
Polish film actresses
Polish stage actresses
People from Zabrze
Silver Bear for Best Actress winners
20th-century Polish actresses